The Gamblers  is a 1929 American drama film directed by Michael Curtiz and starring H.B. Warner, Lois Wilson and Jason Robards Sr. It was produced and distributed by Warner Bros. It is considered to be a lost film.

Plot
Jason Robards Sr. (Carvel Emerson) and George Fawcett (Emerson Jr.) play a father-and-son team of cons who gamble their firm's assets.  Emerson Jr. is caught investing money that does not belong to him and is indicted on a swindling charge.  The district attorney handling the case is the husband of his former sweetheart.  This gives the district attorney an opportunity to prosecute his romantic rival.

Cast
 H. B. Warner as James Darwin
 Lois Wilson as Catherine Darwin
 Jason Robards Sr. as Carvel Emerson
 George Fawcett as Emerson Sr
 Johnny Arthur as George Cowper
 Frank Campeau as Raymond
 Pauline Garon as Isabel Emerson
 Charles Sellon as Tooker

References

External links
 

1929 films
Films directed by Michael Curtiz
1920s English-language films
1929 drama films
American black-and-white films
Warner Bros. films
American drama films
Lost American films
1929 lost films
Lost drama films
1920s American films